Igor Saprykin (born January 30, 1992) is a Russian professional ice hockey goaltender currently playing for HC Vityaz in the Kontinental Hockey League (KHL).

Saprykin made his professional debut with HC Vityaz of the Kontinental Hockey League during the 2012–13 season.

References

External links

1992 births
Living people
HC Kunlun Red Star players
Russian ice hockey goaltenders
Sokol Krasnoyarsk players
HC Vityaz players